Luton Castle was a 12th-century castle in the town of Luton, in the county of Bedfordshire, England.

12th Century Castle
It was a timber motte-and-bailey structure built in 1139 and demolished in 1154 following a truce.

13th Century Castle
Another castle on a different site was built in 1221 but was destroyed around 1224 or 1225. Earthworks and associated bailey survived but were removed.

An excavation was done in 2002, revealing a steep ditch.

The site is now home to Matalan, a discount store. Nothing visible remains of either castle.

References

Castles in Bedfordshire